Helen Zhu is an Internet entrepreneur and social media producer. She is the CEO of Chictopia, an international social media site focused on fashion.

Career
Zhu attended the University of California Berkeley, graduating with a degree in mechanical engineering. For 8 years after graduation, she worked for numerous online companies. In 2008, Zhu, along with fellow UC Berkeley grad Corinne Chan, founded Chictopia.

Chictopia has received mentions in Teen Vogue, Nylon, Women's Wear Daily, and Jezebel. The site currently does more than 13 million pageview per month from 255,000 members.

References

External links
Chictopia
Helen Zhu on Twitter

Year of birth missing (living people)
Living people
Businesspeople from the San Francisco Bay Area
American people of Chinese descent